The Bellevue Hotel can refer to:

Hotel Bellevue Palace, a five-star luxury hotel located in the Old City of Bern, Switzerland 
The Bellevue-Stratford Hotel, luxury hotel located in Philadelphia
Bellevue Hotel, Brisbane in Queensland, Australia (demolished 1979)